Eidsvold was a  motor vessel built in 1934 at Gothenburg for Norwegian Owners. She was torpedoed and sunk in 1942 by the Japanese submarine .

Description
She was propelled by a 489nhp six-cylinder four-stroke single cycle single action diesel engine.

History
Eidsvold was built in as yard number 480 in 1934 by Götaverken A/B, Gothenburg, Sweden for Skibs A/S Eidsiva. She was delivered in September 1934. Eidsvold was operated under the management of Sverre Ditlev Simonsen & Co. Her port of registry was Oslo and the Code Letters LIVR were allocated. In 1940, the vessel was requisitioned by Nortraship.

Fate
On 20 January 1942, Eidsvold was struck by a torpedo from the Japanese submarine I-159 at Flying Fish Cove, Christmas Island. The ship broke in two and was abandoned by her 31 crew. They arrived at Batavia, Netherlands East Indies on 20 February. Her wreck was later towed to near Smith Point..

Notes

1934 ships
Ships built in Gothenburg
Ships of Nortraship
Maritime incidents in January 1942
Shipwrecks of Christmas Island
Ships sunk by Japanese submarines
World War II shipwrecks in the Indian Ocean